Hello Doctor or Health Scan also known as Health Show  is a live phone-in television health show produced by national television DD Odia.

Overview

The DD Odia Health Show embarks upon creating an interface between the remote viewers with the experts in medicine & public health. This show presents complex physiological and anatomical processes in simple and comprehensive audio-visual graphical presentations. During showtime many public health messages are aired corresponding to the topic in the interest of viewers. With its growing popularity, this show is getting 7 to 8 telephonic questions from viewers per episode on an average. Post-telecast feedback of the show continues to maintain its status among the top health shows of Odisha Television.

References

Doordarshan original programming
Indian medical television series